Ryan Roberts (born July 16, 1978) is an American mixed martial artist. Roberts competes in the Featherweight division, but has also competed at Lightweight and Bantamweight. He is the current VFC featherweight champion, and is also known for his short stints in Bellator and UFC.

Mixed martial arts career
Roberts began his mixed martial arts career in 2006 for the AFC promotion, and made local competitor Nick Wright tap out from strikes early in the first round for his first victory. Four fights into his career, Roberts faced future WEC and UFC fighter Donald Cerrone, and was submitted with an armbar in the first round.

He would continue fighting local competitors in various smaller promotions in Iowa, Colorado, and Nebraska, and compiled a professional record of 10–2 before being signed by the Ultimate Fighting Championship in early 2008.

Ultimate Fighting Championship
In his one and only appearance for the UFC, Roberts faced submission specialist and Pride FC standout Marcus Aurelio at UFC Fight Night: Florian vs. Lauzon on April 2, 2008. Roberts was submitted with an armbar in just thirteen seconds, and was subsequently released from the promotion shortly after.

Post-UFC career
Following his UFC release, Roberts would go on a career worst six-fight losing streak against opponents of varying fighting status. On April 2, 2010, Roberts faced Chris Mickle at Midtown Promotions, and won the fight when Roberts knocked out Mickle with a slam in the first round. He won two more fights and was then signed by Bellator.

Bellator Fighting Championship
Roberts faced Eric Marriott in a rematch at Bellator 32 on October 14, 2010. He lost the fight by unanimous decision.

He returned to Bellator after an undefeated run on the regional circuit and faced Zach Makovsky at Bellator 54 on October 15, 2011. Roberts lost the fight by north-south choke and was released from Bellator.

Victory Fighting Championship
Since his release from Bellator, Roberts has made an unexpected career resurgence, successfully capturing the VFC featherweight championship against Josh Arocho on December 15, 2012.

For his first title defense, Roberts faced WEC veteran L.C. Davis at VFC 41 on December 14, 2013. Roberts won the back-and-forth fight by split decision. Roberts then faced Chase Beebe at VFC 42 on March 15, 2014, winning the fight by a dominant unanimous decision.

Roberts faced Jeremy Spoon at VFC: Fight Night Harrahs 1 on September 12, 2014. He won the fight by a razor-thin split decision, marking his third straight successful title defense. In his latest fight, Roberts faced UFC veteran Ramiro Hernandez at VFC 46 on July 25, 2015, winning the fight by first round knockout.

Resurrection Fighting Alliance
Roberts signed with Resurrection Fighting Alliance in mid-2015, and is expected to face prospect Adam Townsend in his debut at RFA 30 on September 18, 2015.

Championships and accomplishments
Victory Fighting Championship
VFC Featherweight Championship (One time)
Four successful title defenses
Fury Fights
FF Lightweight Championship (One time)
The Cage Incorporated
TCI Featherweight Championship (One time)

Mixed martial arts record

|-
|Loss
|align=center| 21–12–1 (1)
|Robert Emerson
|TKO (knee injury)
|VFC 54: Pitolo vs. Kayne 2
|
|align=center|1
|align=center|1:34
|Omaha, Nebraska, United States
|
|-
|Loss
|align=center| 21–11–1 (1)
|Adam Townsend
|Decision (unanimous)
|RFA 30: Smith vs. Jardine
|
|align=center|3
|align=center|5:00
|Lincoln, Nebraska, United States
|
|-
| Win
| align=center| 21–10–1 (1)
| Ramiro Hernandez
| KO (punches)
| VFC: Victory Fighting Championship 46
| 
| align=center| 1
| align=center| 2:12
| Omaha, Nebraska, United States
| 
|-
| Win
| align=center| 20–10–1 (1)
| Jeremy Spoon
| Technical Decision (split)
| VFC: Fight Night Harrahs 1
| 
| align=center| 3
| align=center| 5:00
| Council Bluffs, Iowa, United States
| 
|-
| Win
| align=center| 19–10–1 (1)
| Chase Beebe
| Decision (unanimous)
| VFC: Victory Fighting Championship 42
| 
| align=center| 5
| align=center| 5:00
| Omaha, Nebraska, United States
| 
|-
| Win
| align=center| 18–10–1 (1)
| L.C. Davis
| Decision (split)
| VFC: Victory Fighting Championship 41
| 
| align=center| 5
| align=center| 5:00
| Ralston, Nebraska, United States
|
|-
| Win
| align=center| 17–10–1 (1)
| Josh Arocho
| Decision (unanimous)
| VFC: Victory Fighting Championship 38
| 
| align=center| 5
| align=center| 5:00
| Ralston, Nebraska, United States
| 
|-
| Loss
| align=center| 16–10–1 (1)
| Zach Makovsky
| Submission (north-south choke)
| Bellator LIV
| 
| align=center| 1
| align=center| 4:48
| Atlantic City, New Jersey, United States
| 
|-
| Draw
| align=center| 16–9–1 (1)
| Rick Glenn
| Draw
| MCC 35: Brawl at the Hall
| 
| align=center| 5
| align=center| 5:00
| Des Moines, Iowa, United States
| 
|-
| Win
| align=center| 16–9 (1)
| Nick Mamalis
| Decision (unanimous)
| The Cage Inc.: Battle at the Border 9
| 
| align=center| 5
| align=center| 5:00
| Hankinson, North Dakota, United States
| 
|-
| Win
| align=center| 15–9 (1)
| Dennis Davis
| Decision (unanimous)
| EB: Beatdown at 4 Bears 8
| 
| align=center| 3
| align=center| 5:00
| New Town, North Dakota, United States
| 
|-
| Win
| align=center| 14–9 (1)
| Jeff Lentz
| Decision (unanimous)
| Extreme Challenge: Bad Blood
| 
| align=center| 3
| align=center| 5:00
| Council Bluffs, Iowa, United States
| 
|-
| Loss
| align=center| 13–9 (1)
| Eric Marriott
| Decision (unanimous)
| Bellator XXXII
| 
| align=center| 3
| align=center| 5:00
| Kansas City, Missouri, United States
| 
|-
| Win
| align=center| 13–8 (1)
| Eric Marriott
| Decision (unanimous)
| VFC 32: Dober vs. Seipel 2
| 
| align=center| 3
| align=center| 5:00
| Council Bluffs, Iowa, United States
| 
|-
| Win
| align=center| 12–8 (1)
| Chaz Haag
| TKO (punches)
| CFX / XKL: Mayhem in Minneapolis
| 
| align=center| 1
| align=center| 0:20
| Minneapolis, Minnesota, United States
| 
|-
| Win
| align=center| 11–8 (1)
| Chris Mickle
| KO (slam)
| Midtown Productions: Mayhem at Mancuso
| 
| align=center| 1
| align=center| 3:50
| Omaha, Nebraska, United States
| 
|-
| Loss
| align=center| 10–8 (1)
| Duane Ludwig
| TKO (submission to punches)
| ROF 36: Demolition
| 
| align=center| 1
| align=center| 2:05
| Denver, Colorado, United States
| 
|-
| Loss
| align=center| 10–7 (1)
| Eric Marriott
| Decision (unanimous)
| TFC 14: Titan Fighting Championship 14
| 
| align=center| 3
| align=center| 5:00
| Kansas City, Kansas, United States
| 
|-
| Loss
| align=center| 10–6 (1)
| Jonathan Murphy
| TKO (punches)
| XFO: Xtreme Fighting Organization 28
| 
| align=center| 1
| align=center| 2:24
| Lakemoor, Illinois, United States
| 
|-
| Loss
| align=center| 10–5 (1)
| Joe Wilk
| Submission (guillotine choke)
| VFC 26: Onslaught
| 
| align=center| 1
| align=center| 3:06
| Council Bluffs, Iowa, United States
| 
|-
| Loss
| align=center| 10–4 (1)
| John Mahlow
| Submission
| AE: Atomic Enterprizes
| 
| align=center| 2
| align=center| 2:10
| Sarasota, Florida, United States
| 
|-
| Loss
| align=center| 10–3 (1)
| Marcus Aurelio
| Submission (armbar)
| UFC Fight Night: Florian vs. Lauzon
| 
| align=center| 1
| align=center| 0:16
| Broomfield, Colorado, United States
| 
|-
| Win
| align=center| 10–2 (1)
| Joe Doherty
| Decision (unanimous)
| VFC 22: Ascension
| 
| align=center| 5
| align=center| 5:00
| 
| 
|-
| Win
| align=center| 9–2 (1)
| Zach Wolff
| TKO (punches)
| VFC 22: Ascension
| 
| align=center| 2
| align=center| 2:23
| 
| 
|-
| Loss
| align=center| 8–2 (1)
| Alonzo Martinez
| Submission
| VFC 20: Aces
| 
| align=center| 1
| align=center| N/A
| Council Bluffs, Iowa, United States
| 
|-
| Win
| align=center| 8–1 (1)
| Rocky Johnson
| Decision (split)
| Battlequest 6: Shootout
| 
| align=center| 3
| align=center| 5:00
| Eagle, Colorado, United States
| 
|-
| NC
| align=center| 7–1 (1)
| Zac George
| No Contest
| IFO: Eastman vs. Kimmons
| 
| align=center| 1
| align=center| 2:09
| Las Vegas, Nevada, United States
| 
|-
| Win
| align=center| 7–1
| Eugene Crisler
| TKO (punches)
| XFO: Xtreme Fighting Organization 18
| 
| align=center| 2
| align=center| 1:37
| Wisconsin Dells, Wisconsin, United States
| 
|-
| Win
| align=center| 6–1
| Alex Rutter
| KO (punches)
| VFC 19: Inferno
| 
| align=center| 1
| align=center| 3:22
| Council Bluffs, Iowa, United States
| 
|-
| Win
| align=center| 5–1
| Jake Burriola
| Submission (keylock)
| GFC 1: Genesis
| 
| align=center| 2
| align=center| 3:19
| Des Moines, Iowa, United States
| 
|-
| Loss
| align=center| 4–1
| Donald Cerrone
| Submission (armbar)
| ROF 28: Evolution
| 
| align=center| 1
| align=center| 1:49
| Broomfield, Colorado, United States
| 
|-
| Win
| align=center| 4–0
| Josh Smidt
| Submission (rear-naked choke)
| RFN 2: Royalty Fight Night 2
| 
| align=center| 2
| align=center| 1:37
| Emmetsburg, Iowa, United States
| 
|-
| Win
| align=center| 3–0
| Ryan Heckert
| TKO (punches)
| VFC 17: Predators
| 
| align=center| 1
| align=center| 1:15
| Council Bluffs, Iowa, United States
| 
|-
| Win
| align=center| 2–0
| Tony Hawkins
| TKO (punches)
| Fury Fights: Battle in Brookings 1
| 
| align=center| 1
| align=center| 2:18
| South Dakota, United States, United States
| 
|-
| Win
| align=center| 1–0
| Nick Wright
| TKO (submission to punches)
| AFC 9: Fresh Meat
| 
| align=center| 1
| align=center| N/A
| Omaha, Nebraska, United States
|

Bare knuckle boxing record

|-
|Win
|align=center|1–0
|Jorge Gonzalez
|KO (punch)
|BKFC 21
|
|align=center|2
|align=center|0:29
|Omaha, Nebraska, United States

See also
List of male mixed martial artists

References

External links
 
 

1978 births
American male mixed martial artists
Bantamweight mixed martial artists
Featherweight mixed martial artists
Lightweight mixed martial artists
Living people
Mixed martial artists from Nebraska
Ultimate Fighting Championship male fighters